Curry's Creek was a settlement located 3 miles south of Kendalia in Kendall County, Texas. The settlement was founded in 1850. In the 1850s Currey's Creek had a population of 100 or more. Judge Samuel B. Patton moved to Currey's Creek in 1847 when the area was still in Blanco County.

Historical population
1860 = 100

References

Ghost towns in Central Texas
Populated places established in 1850
1850 establishments in Texas
Populated places in Kendall County, Texas